Fuerza (lit. Force) was a political party in Guatemala.

History
The party was established in 2011 by Maurico Redford. Prior to the 2015 elections it nominated Alejandro Giammattei as its presidential candidate; Giammattei finished fourth in a field of fourteen candidates with 6% of the vote. In the Congressional elections the party received 2% of the vote, winning two of the 158 seats; Raul Romero Segura in Guatemala City and Claude Harmelin de Leon in Guatemala Department.

References

External links
Official website

2011 establishments in Guatemala
2020 disestablishments in Guatemala
Centrist parties in North America
Conservative parties in Guatemala
Defunct political parties in Guatemala
Nationalist parties in Guatemala
Political parties disestablished in 2020
Political parties established in 2011